The Men's sprint at the 2014 UCI Track Cycling World Championships was held on 1–2 March 2014. 32 cyclists  participated in the contest.

Medalists

Results

Qualifying
The qualifying was held at 12:00.

1/16 finals
The 1/16 finals were held at 13:05.

1/8 finals
The 1/8 finals were held at 14:40.

1/8 finals repechages
The 1/8 finals repechages were held at 15:30.

Quarterfinals
Race 1 was held at 18:40 and Race 2 at 19:35.

Race for 5th–8th places
The race for 5th–8th places was held at 20:50.

Semifinals
Race 1 was held at 15:30, Race 2 at 16:00 and Race 3 at 16:20.

Finals
Race 1 was held at 17:00 and Race 2 at 17:25.

References

2014 UCI Track Cycling World Championships
UCI Track Cycling World Championships – Men's sprint